The 2022 World Ski Orienteering Championships was held from 15 to 19 March 2022 in Kemi-Keminmaa, Finland.

Medal summary

Medal table

Men

Women

Mixed

Participants 
A total of 106 competitors and 34 officials from the national teams of the following 16 countries was registered to compete at 2022 World Ski Orienteering Championships.

  (2)
  (2)
  (8)
  (8)
  (16)
  (1)
  (4)
  (4)
  (7)
  (4)
  (4)
  (16)
  (1)
  (15)
  (12)
  (2)

References

External links
Official website

World Ski Orienteering Championships
World Ski Orienteering Championships
International sports competitions hosted by Finland
World Ski Orienteering Championships
Ski